Catalinimonas alkaloidigena is a Gram-negative and aerobic bacterium from the genus of Catalinimonas.

References

Cytophagia
Bacteria described in 2013